HMS Gorgon was a wooden steam paddle sloop of 6 guns, launched in 1837. In 1840 she took part in the bombardment of Acre, and in 1843 was part of the Royal Navy squadron stationed in the River Plate during the Uruguayan Civil War. She was converted to a troopship and in 1858 assisted  in the laying of the first transatlantic telegraph cable. She was sold for breaking in 1864.

Design and construction
Gorgon was designed by Sir William Symonds and was the first vessel to be fitted with direct-acting engines. She was laid down at Pembroke Royal Dockyard in July 1836 and launched on 31 August 1837.

Engines
Gorgon's had two engines of 160 horse power each, built by Seaward and Company. It were direct-acting engines, and as such they were a novel construction remarkable for compactness, strength and lightness. It placed the crankshaft directly above the center line of the cylinders and these were connected to the shaft by means of a simple connecting rod. The absence of the usual cast-iron framing, sway-beams, side-rods and crossheads saved upwards of 60 tons in weight. The absence of the sway beams and cross-head also meant that the vibration of the engines was deemed barely perceptible. The space occupied by the machined was little over half that of side-lever engines of the same power.

For producing steam the Gorgon had four copper boilers. These stood in pairs, and back to back, but nevertheless quite detached from each other. These could be used independently, allowing repairs to be made to some while others were in use. There were 12 fireplaces and two stoke-holes.

The engine room measured 62 feet from the after-bulk-head to the fore bulk-head. The coal boxes of the Gorgon reached along the whole engine room and were 8 feet wide on average. They allowed for storage of 400 tons of coals, or 16 days steaming.

Armament
Gorgon served with an armament of six heavy guns, but this was not according to design. The original design was for her to have a gun deck with 12 32 pdrs 56cwt, 4 more 32 pdrs 56cwt on the upper deck, and two 10-inch 96 pdrs on swivel beds fore and aft. After Gorgon was launched and equipped, it proved that she was so deep into the water that it was necessary to permanently close the ports meant for the guns on the gun deck.

In 1847 the Gorgon had on the upper deck: 1 68-pounder 90 cwt, 1 10-inch gun 85 cwt, and 4 32-pounders 42 cwt gun C. On the main deck it was to have 1 32-pounder 56 cwt. Note that the 32-pounders 42 cwt Gun C (first tried in 1838) used on the superstructure was significantly lighter than that of 56 cwt, and there was now supposed to be one gun of 56 cwt on the main deck.

Service 
At the height of the battle either Gorgon or her sister ship  fired the shell that destroyed Acre's powder magazine, causing an explosion that greatly weakened the city's defences.

In 1843, during the Uruguayan Civil War, Gorgon arrived in the River Plate to join the Royal Navy squadron commanded by Commodore John Purvis. She anchored in the bay as a deterrent to potential attackers. She ran aground in the River Plate on 10 May 1844 but was subsequently refloated.

From 23 February 1854 to 8 May 1854 Gorgon was commanded by Commander (and Captain) Arthur Cumming. On 23 July, she collided with the Prussian barque Mentor in the English Channel off Beachy Head, Sussex. Mentor was severely damaged; she was towed in to The Downs in a waterlogged condition.

From August 1856 – June 1857 HMS Gorgon was at Boudroum (modern Bodrum) under Captain George William Towsey, commissioned to transport the finds from Sir Charles Thomas Newton's excavation at the Mausoleum of Halikarnassos to the British Museum.

In 1858 Gorgon assisted in the laying of the first transatlantic telegraph cable by taking soundings for the former warship HMS Agamemnon, which had been converted into a cable ship. When the cable link was completed to New York, the crew of the Gorgon and the other ships were feted by civic receptions and processions through the city.

Gorgon was despatched to Madagascar in 1863 to keep the peace on the death of King Radama II. She returned via the Cape of Good Hope, arriving at Spithead on 29 January 1864. She discharged her ammunition and guns at the Royal Arsenal, was paid out of commission on 11 February.

Despite being decommissioned, Gorgon had one last mission. The vessel was towed to Greenhithe on 6 May 1864 to act as a receiving hulk for the crew of HMS Osborne, seven of whom had acquired smallpox. The ship was ultimately dismantled at Woolwich. She was sold to Charlton for breaking on 17 October 1864.

References

Bibliography

External links 
 
 Naval database: Gorgon, 1837

 

Paddle sloops of the Royal Navy
Ships built in Pembroke Dock
1837 ships
Victorian-era sloops of the United Kingdom
Crimean War naval ships of the United Kingdom
Maritime incidents in May 1844